The Nordhausen tramway network is a network of tramways forming part of the public transport system in Nordhausen, a city in the federal state of Thuringia, Germany.

Opened in 1900, the network is currently operated by Stadtwerke Nordhausen, and has three lines, including one linking Nordhausen with nearby Ilfeld, running as a tram-train on the tracks belonging to the Harz Narrow Gauge Railways.

Tram-train 
Nordhausen also practices a unique model of tram-train operation, in which dual-power railcars operate using electric power in the town, and change to diesel-electric to operate on the Harzer Schmalspurbahn (HSB) line to Ilfeld.

On HSB’s centenary in September 1999, HSB and Stadtwerke Nordhausen signed a declaration of intent for the development, and work began in 2002. A track was built connecting the Bahnhofsvorplatz tram stop along Oskar-Cohn-Straße to the Harzquerbahn sidings at Nordhausen Nord station.

Since the HSB is not electrified, new dual-power vehicles had to be procured. On 3 June 2000, as part of the centenary celebrations of the Nordhausen tram, the first such vehicle was presented. Dubbed the Twino, it was a GT4 railcar fitted with a five-cylinder passenger car diesel engine, and was used for practical testing of dual-power operation. The municipal utilities bought three DuoCombino trams, fitted with BMW M67 3.9-litre twin-turbocharged V8 engines.

On 1 May 2004, route 10 was launched. It follows the course of route 1 from the Südharz Klinikum hospital through Nordhausen town centre to the station forecourt, and then along the Harzquerbahn track to Ilfeld Neanderklinik, a distance of 11.4 km.

Lines 
Since 2004, Nordhausen has had the following three tram lines:

See also
List of town tramway systems in Germany
Trams in Germany

References

External links

 
 
 

Nordhausen, Thuringia
Nordhausen
Transport in Thuringia
Metre gauge railways in Germany
Nordhausen